Wilderness State Park is a public recreation area bordering Lake Michigan, five miles southwest of   Mackinaw City in Emmet County in Northern Michigan.  The state park's  include  of shoreline, diverse forested dune and swale complexes, wetlands, camping areas, and many miles of hiking trails. The state park is operated by the Michigan Department of Natural Resources, which has, as of 2006, approved a proposal that  be officially dedicated as a wilderness area. Wilderness State Park was designated a Michigan "dark sky preserve" in 2012.

Description

One of the most prominent physical features of the park is Waugoshance Point, which juts westward into northern Lake Michigan. Beyond the tip of the point, Temperance Island and Waugoshance Island are also parts of the state park. Four Lake Michigan lighthouses sit near the park's western boundary. Stations at Grays Reef, Skillagalee Island, Waugoshance, and White Shoal warn shipping away from the dangerous reefs and shoals of Waugoshance Point.

History
The state began acquiring the park's lands in 1896 through purchase and tax reversion proceedings. After the reversion of additional acreage for tax nonpayment in the early years of the twentieth century, the site became the Emmet State Game Refuge in 1922, with the land set aside for the breeding of game birds and other animals. When the game reserve was placed under the administration of the Parks Division in 1927, it officially became Wilderness State Park.

The Civilian Conservation Corps was active in the park for six years during the 1930s. The corps' workers built various structures, eight miles of trails, a public campground, and four-acre Goose Pond.

Wildlife
The park supports populations of many animals that are part of the traditional image of the northern Great Lakes ecosystem, including American black bear, snowshoe hare, beaver, porcupines, bobcats, mink, muskrats, and otter. The park's cobble beach areas provide an excellent habitat for the federally endangered piping plover. As of 2002, approximately one-third of Michigan's nesting pairs of piping plovers were found in Wilderness State Park. One of the first sightings of wolves in the Lower Peninsula was reported along the park's shoreline by a Coast Guard pilot in 1997. In 2015, MDNR officials confirmed the presence of wolves in the Lower Peninsula.

Activities and amenities

The state park offers swimming, picnicking, boat launch, fishing, a 250-site campground and cabins. The state park contains  of trails for hiking, mountain biking, cross-country skiing and snowmobiling, that include a  section of the North Country Trail.

References

External links

Wilderness State Park Map Michigan Department of Natural Resources
Wilderness State Park Michigan Department of Natural Resources

State parks of Michigan
Protected areas of Emmet County, Michigan
Protected areas established in 1922
1922 establishments in Michigan
Important Bird Areas of Michigan
Civilian Conservation Corps in Michigan